Vasily Ivanovich Zhukov (Russian: Васи́лий Ива́нович Жу́ков; born  April 1, 1947) is a member of the Russian Academy of Sciences and has a Ph.D. in history. Professor Zhukov is the rector of the Russian State Social University (Российский государственный социальный университет).

References 

ЖУКОВ, Василий Иванович (Russian)  (Google Translated version)

See also 
Education in Russia
List of universities in Russia

20th-century Russian historians
Living people
1947 births
Full Members of the Russian Academy of Sciences
Academic staff of Russian State Social University